Verulam Secondary is a South African school in Verulam, KwaZulu-Natal.  Founded in 1951, it currently schools over 1000 students. The principal was  but due to his retirement deputy principal SCOBA  is now the new principal.

Description
Its badge is in a shape of a shield with the words Verulam Secondary, and its slogan which is "Live And Help Poes" embedded on it. It is currently located on 131 George Sewerpersadh Street, Verulam.

Subjects offered
GET Phase - Afrikaans, English, Mathematics, Natural Science, History, Geography, IsiZulu, Hindi, Tamil, Arabic, African Religion, Creative Arts, Economic And Management Sciences

FET Phase -  Afrikaans, English, Mathematics, IsiZulu, Business Studies, Dramatic Arts, Geography, Mathematical Literacy, Life Orientation, Accounting, Life Sciences, Physical Sciences, Information Technology, Central Applications Technology, Tourism, Hospitality, and Consumer Studies.

Sports Offered
Soccer, Table Tennis, Chess, Debating, Cricket, Volleyball, Netball, and Speech.

History
Founded in 1951, the school principal was Mr. M.I. Ismail until 2014. The school has produced excellent achievements such as : speech and debating winners, sportsmen, musicians, teachers, and some of the best Matric results with some learners being placed in the Countries top 10 and many others representing the school in international competitions like the International Junior Science Olympiad and the Mathematics Olympiad held in India.

In popular culture
The MEC of Education, Ms Peggy Nkonyeni has visited the school to deliver a speech about the #BringBackOurGirls campaign.

Upcoming rap trio Prototype SA has made several performances there alongside Luyanda The Zumanator who is currently a scholar at Verulam Secondary.

The school has hosted a school concert and a Spring Fair which are in tribute of their ex-principal Mr. M. I. Ismail.

One of the cast members of a popular Bollywood movie Run For Your Life has been a teacher there.

The school has made many "takeovers" at a popular theme park in Durban called Ushaka Marine World.

References

Schools in KwaZulu-Natal
Educational institutions established in 1951
1951 establishments in South Africa